Mark Johnston is an Australian philosopher and the Henry Putnam University Professor of Philosophy at Princeton University, where he is also the Director of the Program in Cognitive Science.

Biography and career 
A native of Australia, Johnston was "educated by Jesuits and briefly considered taking priestly orders before opting for a PhD in philosophy instead." Johnston received his Ph.D. in philosophy from Princeton University in 1984 after completing a doctoral dissertation, titled "Particulars and persistence", under the supervision of Saul Kripke and David Lewis.

Johnston is also the Senior Academic Advisor to the Marc Sanders Foundation, which awards prizes for the best work in various areas of philosophy, such as metaphysics, philosophy of religion, and ethics.

Philosophical work 

Johnston has written many articles on topics in metaphysics, philosophy of mind, philosophical logic, and metaethics and, more recently, two books in philosophy of religion, Saving God:  Religion After Idolatry (Princeton University Press, 2009) and Surviving Death (Princeton University Press, 2010).  The literary critic James Wood picked Saving God as one of the top non-fiction books of 2009 in The New Yorker.

Selected articles
"Human Beings," Journal of Philosophy 84 (1987):  59–83.
"Dispositional Theories of Value," Proceedings of the Aristotelian Society 63 (1989):  89-174 (with David K. Lewis and Michael A. Smith)
"Reasons and Reductionism," Philosophical Review (1992):  589–618.
"Constitution is Not Identity," Mind 101 (1992):  89–106.
"Manifest Kinds," Journal of Philosophy 94 (1997):  564–583.
"The Obscure Object of Hallucination," Philosophical Studies 120 (2004): 113–83.
"Hylomorphism," Journal of Philosophy 103 (2006): 652–698.

References

Year of birth missing (living people)
Living people
20th-century Australian philosophers
21st-century Australian philosophers
Analytic philosophers
Princeton University faculty
Metaphysicians
Philosophers of identity
Philosophers of mind